Gros-Câlin is a 1979 French-Italian comedy film written and directed by Jean-Pierre Rawson and starring  Jean Carmet  and Nino Manfredi. It is loosely based on the novel with the same name by Romain Gary.

Plot

Cast 

Jean Carmet as Émile Cousin
Nino Manfredi as  Parisi
Marthe Villalonga as   Madame Astrid
Veronique Mucret as  Irene Dreyfus
Jean-Pierre Coffe  as  Father Joseph 
Alvaro Vitali as  Brancardier 
Jacqueline Doyen  as  Madame Niatte
Jeanne Herviale  as  Irene's concierge
Enrico Maria Salerno as  The President 
Francis Perrin as  Taxi Driver
Katia Tchenko as The whore

References

External links

French comedy films
Italian comedy films
1979 comedy films
1979 films
Films with screenplays by Age & Scarpelli
1970s French-language films
1970s French films
1970s Italian films